The Expos are a Canadian reggae band from Newmarket, Ontario. Their music blends reggae with psychedelia and heavy drums.

History
The band formed in 2003 under the name "The Donuts". Their debut album, "Old Friends", was released in 2005 under that name.  The album was re-released in 2007 under the new record label, Stomp, and their new name, "The Expos". The recording featured a horn section and Hammond organ.

In 2009 the band released an album, Blackwater. The tracks included more harmony and thoughtful lyrics than their earlier work, as well as showcasing horns, drum tones, Hammond organ music and Neagle's vocals, which were enhanced by the use of an old fashion E-V Model 635A microphone.

In 2013 the band performed at the Montreal Ska Fest.

Band members

 Reed Neagle – vocals, drums
 Michel Verrier – vocals, organ
 Christopher Shannon – backing vocals, bass guitar
 Adam Pariselli – backing vocals, guitar

Discography

 2007: Old Friends
 2009: Blackwater
 2012: Lake House

Compilations
 2006: Mad Butcher Records Skannibal Part 6 Germany 
 2007: One Big Family Vol. 3 Japan 
 2008: Salad Gold 15 Sampler Canada

References

External links
 The Expos on Myspace

One Big Family Records 

Canadian reggae musical groups
Musical groups from Newmarket, Ontario
Musical groups established in 2003
2003 establishments in Ontario